Lovin' Feelings is the second studio album by American actor and singer David Hasselhoff. It was released on October 18, 1987, by CBS Records. The album was produced by Bruce Lynch and recorded in Auckland, New Zealand. The album also was a departure from the rock background of his debut studio album Night Rocker (1985).

"Life is Mostly Beautiful With You" was released as the only single from the album. The album reached the top-twenty in Austria and Germany, being certified Gold in the former country.

Track listing

Charts

Weekly charts

Year-end charts

Certifications

References 

David Hasselhoff albums
1987 albums
Covers albums
CBS Records albums